Lawn bowls at the 2010 Commonwealth Games was held at the J.N. Sports Complex.  The events were held from 4 to 13 October 2010.

Events

Men

Women

Medal table

Participating nations

References

See also
List of Commonwealth Games medallists in lawn bowls
Lawn bowls at the Commonwealth Games

 
2010 Commonwealth Games events
2010
2010 in bowls
Bowls in India